Smothered is a 2016 horror comedy directed and written by John Schneider. The film stars Kane Hodder, Bill Moseley, R. A. Mihailoff, Malcolm Danare, and Don Shanks as several horror icons that find themselves the focus of a murderous hunt.

Synopsis
After a convention appearance gig turns out to be wildly unsuccessful and unpleasant, a group of cult horror icons find themselves reluctantly persuaded to haunt a trailer park. Lured by the promise of $1,000 apiece for what should be relatively easy work, the group arrives at the park but soon discovers that there is more to the job than they had initially been led to believe and that their own lives are at risk.

Cast
Kane Hodder as Striper
R. A. Mihailoff as himself
Bill Moseley as Soggy Christian
Dane Rhodes as Randy
Malcolm Danare as himself
Don Shanks as himself
Rachel Alana Handler as Chunks
Amy Brassette as Agness
Ritchie Montgomery as Mountain Man
Brea Grant as DeeDee
John Schneider as Player
Michael Berryman as himself
John Kassir as himself
Andrew Bowen as Carl
Shanna Forrestall as Trixie

Production
Filming mostly took place on Schneider's John Schneider Studios lot in Louisiana and additional scenes were shot in downtown Baton Rouge during summer 2013. For casting Schneider had a table read in Baton Rouge and cast Shanna Forrestall and Dane Rhodes based on their performances at the read. He had initially intended for Roddy Piper to perform in the film and after Piper was unable to take part in Smothered, Schneider re-wrote and renamed Piper's role for Rhodes. While writing the script Schneider changed the name of Moseley's character several times before choosing "Soggy Christian" and also added in that Moseley's character was a recovering alcoholic, which Moseley greatly enjoyed.

Reception
Shock Till You Drop gave Smothered a positive review and remarked that it was "a fun film because it gives us a chance to see some of our horror heroes in a different light."

References

External links
 
 
 

2016 films
2016 comedy horror films
Films shot in Louisiana
American comedy horror films
2010s English-language films
2010s American films